Thomas William Shapcott  (born 21 March 1935) is an Australian poet, novelist, playwright, editor, librettist, short story writer and teacher.

Biography 

Thomas William Shapcott was born in Ipswich, Queensland, and attended the Ipswich Grammar School with his twin brother, who was born on the previous day (20 March 1935). (The writer is left-handed, but his twin is right-handed.) He left school at 15 to work in his father's accountancy business, but completed an accountancy degree in 1961.  In 1967 he graduated in arts from the University of Queensland.

His first artistic impulse was to be a composer. By age 19, he had written a number of works, but he turned away from music when he discovered a string quartet he had written unconsciously plagiarised a chamber work by Ernest Bloch. He then worked as a tax accountant, a profession that he pursued for 27 years.

He was director of the Australia Council's Literature Board for seven years, and Executive Director of the National Book Council (1992–97). He was Professor of Creative Writing at Adelaide University.

He has written 15 collections of poetry and 6 novels.

Thomas Shapcott was appointed an Officer (AO) of the Order of Australia in 1989.

Selected list of works

Poetry collections
 Time on Fire (1961)
 The Mankind Thing (1964)
 Sonnets 1960-1963 (1964)
 A Taste of Salt Water : Poems (1967)
 Inwards to the Sun : Poems (1969)
 Fingers at Air : Experimental Poems 1969 (1969)
 Interim Report : some poems 1970/71 (1971)
 Begin with Walking (1972)
 Two Voices : Poems (1973) with Margaret Shapcott
 Shabbytown Calendar (1975)
 Seventh Avenue Poems (1976)
 Selected Poems (1978)
 Turning Full Circle (1979)
 Stump and Grape and Bopple-Nut (1981)
 Welcome! (1983)
 Travel Dice (1987)
 Selected Poems 1956-1988 (1989)
 In the Beginning (1990)
 The City of Home (1995)
 The Sun's Waste is Our Energy (1998)
 Cities in Exile (1998)
 Chekhov's Mongoose (2000)
 Music Circus and Other Poems (2004)
 Adelaide Lunch Sonnets (2006)
 The City of Empty Rooms (2006)
 The Book of Hanging Gardens (2009)
 Part of Us (2010)
 At Marcoola (2011)

Novels
 The Birthday Gift (1982)
 White Stag of Exile (1984)
 Hotel Bellevue (1986)
 The Search for Galina (1989)
 Mona's Gift (1993)
 Theatre of Darkness (1998)
 Spirit Wrestlers (2004)

Short story collections
 Limestone and Lemon Wine : Stories (1988)
 What You Own : Stories (1991)
 Gatherers and Hunters : Stories (2011)

Young Adult
 Holiday of the Ikon (1984)
 Flood Children (1981)

Non-fiction
 Writers Interviews with the Camera (1989)
 Biting the Bullet : A Literary memoir (1990)
 Twins in the Family : Interviews with Australian Twins (2001)

Awards

Grace Leven Poetry Prize, 1961: winner for "Time on Fire".
Myer Award for Australian Poetry, 1967: winner for A taste of salt water
C.J. Dennis Memorial Poetry Competition, Open Section, 1976: commended for The five senses
Canada-Australia Literary Award, 1978
Officer of the Order of Australia, 1989, for his services to Literature
 Golden Wreath of the Struga Poetry Evenings laureate, 1990
Wesley Michel Wright Prize for Poetry, 1996
New South Wales Premier's Literary Awards, Special Discretionary Award, 1996
Patrick White Award, 2000
Harold White Fellowships, 2005. Note: to examine the papers of Ray Mathew
Honorary Doctorate of Literature from Macquarie University

See alsoFirst Seed Ripening'' an album by Elixir and Katie Noonan. The tracks on this album are inspired by Shapcott's writing.

References

External links 
 Brisbane Writers Festival Site
 Academy Library – Thomas W. Shapcott

1935 births
Living people
20th-century Australian novelists
Academic staff of the University of Adelaide
Australian male novelists
Australian poets
People from Ipswich, Queensland
Officers of the Order of Australia
Patrick White Award winners
Australian twins
Struga Poetry Evenings Golden Wreath laureates
Australian male poets
20th-century Australian male writers